Maja Jakobsen (born 28 March 1990) is a Norwegian handball player. She currently plays for Storhamar HE. 

She made her debut on the Norwegian national team in 2012.

Achievements
Junior European Championship:
Winner: 2009
Junior World Championship:
Winner: 2010
European Championship:
Winner: 2014
Silver Medalist: 2012
Norwegian League
Silver Medalist: 2019/2020, 2020/2021, 2021/2022
Bronze Medalist: 2007/2008, 2009/2010, 2011/2012
Norwegian Cup:
Finalist: 2019

Individual awards
 All-Star Right Back of REMA 1000-ligaen: 2020/2021
Grundigligaen: Top scorer 2014/2015 (162 goals)

References

External links

 

1990 births
Living people
Norwegian female handball players
Norwegian expatriate sportspeople in Denmark
21st-century Norwegian women